Johannes Vilhelm Jensen (20 January 1873 – 25 November 1950) was a Danish author, known as one of the great Danish writers of the first half of 20th century. He was awarded the 1944 Nobel Prize in Literature "for the rare strength and fertility of his poetic imagination with which is combined an intellectual curiosity of wide scope and a bold, freshly creative style". One of his sisters, Thit Jensen, was also a well-known writer and a very vocal, and occasionally controversial, early feminist.

Early years
He was born in Farsø, a village in North Jutland, Denmark, as the son of a veterinary surgeon and he grew up in a rural environment. While studying medicine at the University of Copenhagen he worked as a writer to fund his studies. After three years of studying he chose to change careers and devote himself fully to literature.

Literary works

The first phase of his work as an author was influenced by fin-de-siècle pessimism. His career began with the publication of Himmerland Stories (1898–1910), comprising a series of tales set in the part of Denmark where he was born. During 1900 and 1901 he wrote his first masterpiece, Kongens Fald (translated into English as The Fall of the King in 1933), a modern historical novel centred on King Christian II. Literary critic Martin Seymour-Smith said it is an "indictment of Danish indecision and lack of vitality, which Jensen saw as a national disease. Apart from this aspect of it, it is a penetrating study of sixteenth-century people."

In 1906 Jensen created his greatest literary achievement: the collection of verses Digte 1906 (i.e. Poems 1906), which introduced the prose poem to Danish literature. He also wrote poetry, a few plays, and many essays, chiefly on anthropology and the philosophy of evolution. His short story "Ane og Koen" ("Anne and the Cow") was translated into English by incarcerated author and translator Victor Folke Nelson in 1928.

He developed his theories of evolution in a cycle of six novels, Den lange rejse (1908–22), translated into English as The Long Journey (1923–24), which was published in a two-volume edition in 1938. This is often considered his main work in prose, a daring and often impressive attempt to create a Darwinian alternative to the Biblical Genesis myth. In this work we see the development of mankind from the Ice Age to the times of Columbus, focusing on pioneering individuals.

Like his compatriot Hans Christian Andersen, he travelled extensively; a trip to the United States inspired a poem of his, "Paa Memphis Station" [At the train station, Memphis, Tennessee], which is well known in Denmark. Walt Whitman was among the writers who influenced Jensen. Jensen later became an atheist.

Late career
Jensen's most popular literary works were all completed before 1920, a year which also marks his initiation of the 'Museumcentre Aars' in the town of Aars in Himmerland. After this he mostly concentrated on ambitious biological and zoological studies in an effort to create an ethical system based upon Darwinian ideas. He also hoped to renew classical poetry.

For many years he worked in journalism, writing articles and chronicles for the daily press without ever joining the staff of any newspaper.

Nobel Prize in Literature
In 1944 Johannes V. Jensen was awarded the Nobel Prize in Literature "for the rare strength and fertility of his poetic imagination with which is combined an intellectual curiosity of wide scope and a bold, freshly creative style." At the award ceremony in Stockholm on 10 December 1945 Anders Österling, permanent secretary of the Swedish Academy said: 

Jensen had been nominated for the Nobel Prize in Literature on 53 occasions, the first time in 1925. He was nominated every year between 1931 and 1944.

Legacy
Jensen was a controversial figure in Danish cultural life. He was a reckless polemicist and his often dubious racial theories have damaged his reputation. However, he never showed any fascist leanings.

Today Jensen is still considered the father of Danish modernism, particularly in the area of modern poetry with his introduction of the prose poem and his use of a direct and straightforward language. His direct influence was felt as late as the 1960s. Without being a Danish answer to Kipling, Hamsun or Sandburg, he bears comparison to all three authors. He combines the outlook of the regional writer with the view of the modern academic and scientific observer.

In 1999, The Fall of the King (1901) was acclaimed as the best Danish novel of the 20th century by the newspapers Politiken and Berlingske Tidende, independently of each other.

Johannes V. Jensen Land in Northern Greenland was named in his honor.

Bibliography

Works in English
 The Long Journey, vol 1–3, (Fire and Ice; The Cimbrians; Christopher Columbus) New York, 1924.
 The Fall of the King, 1933.

References

External links

 
 
 
List of Works
 

1873 births
1950 deaths
People from Vesthimmerland Municipality
Danish Nobel laureates
Danish male short story writers
20th-century Danish dramatists and playwrights
Danish male poets
Danish essayists
Nobel laureates in Literature
Danish male novelists
Danish male dramatists and playwrights
Burials at East Bispebjerg Cemetery
Male essayists
Danish male writers
20th-century Danish poets
20th-century Danish short story writers
20th-century essayists
20th-century Danish novelists